Christine Figgener (born October 30, 1983) is a German marine conservation biologist, author, science communicator, and ocean advocate recognized for her work in sea turtle conservation, the fight against plastic pollution, and the empowerment of women in STEM. She is best known for documenting the removal of a plastic straw from a sea turtle's nose in a YouTube video that went viral in 2015. This video, which was featured in popular media outlets such as National Geographic, HuffPost, The New York Times, ABC News, and CNN, highlighted the dangers of plastic pollution on marine wildlife and was a catalyst for the global anti-straw movement that led to several straw bans by businesses such as Starbucks, Disney, and Alaska Airlines.

She was named a Next Generation Leader by Time magazine in 2018 and has been the director of Science & Education for Footprint Foundation since 2020.

Early years 
Figgener grew up in the small, land-locked town of Marl in West Germany where she attended kindergarten, primary school, and high school. In the 11th grade, Figgener did a high school exchange to California where she went to Lindsay High School.

From a young age, Figgener was interested in ocean exploration, likely due to her parents' love for the ocean and frequent vacations close to the ocean. She had the desire to leave Germany and travel the world early in her life. Childhood friends say she already talked in primary school about becoming a marine biologist.

As a child, Figgener liked watching documentaries by Hans Hass and Jacques Yves Costeau and found a role model in Hans Hass' wife Lotte Hass, who was frequently featured in his films. Another big role model of hers was Jane Goodall, after she found the German translation of the book In the Shadow of Man at a public library sale. When Figgener was 13 she started volunteering at the dolphinarium in the Allwetter Zoo in Münster, Germany.

Education 
Figgener earned her German Vordiplom (Bachelor of Science) in biology in November 2005 from Eberhard-Karls-University, in Tübingen, Baden-Württemberg, Germany. In March 2010 she was awarded her German Diplom (Masters of Science) in biology from Julius-Maximilian-University, in Würzburg, Germany, majoring in behavioral physiology and animal ecology. Her thesis focused on a genetic paternity assay and general population genetics of the Caribbean leatherback sea turtle population in Costa Rica. In fall 2019, she earned her PhD in marine biology from Texas A&M University in the southern United States. Her dissertation focused on trophic and movement ecology of sea turtles using stable isotope analysis and satellite tracking to gain new insights into the behavioral ecology of olive ridley sea turtles.

Work 
Figgener has been working with sea turtles  in Central America since 2007, focusing on applying her research findings to the conservation of these animals. Her work highlights the threats to our oceans and its inhabitants due to human impact. Figgener fosters awareness of these issues by speaking out about the difference everyone can make by changing daily habits, such as limiting the use of single-use plastic products.

Since 2020, Figgener has served as the director of Science & Education for Footprint Foundation, the non-profit arm of Footprint. She is still actively involved in sea turtle research and conservation in Costa Rica through her Costa Rican non-profit COASTS and her social enterprise Nāmaka Conservation Science.

Public moments 
In 2013, Figgener's good friend and colleague Jairo "Foca" Mora Sandoval was murdered while protecting leatherback turtle nests in Moín, Costa Rica. The news made it around the world and a photo she had taken of Jairo at a project in Ostional, Costa Rica was used for many of the headlines. She was later quoted that this tragic event changed the trajectory of her life and increased her yearning "to have more impact and to do more".

In 2015, Figgener was thrust into the international spotlight when she filmed the removal of a plastic straw stuck in a sea turtle's nostril while on a research expedition for her doctoral dissertation in Costa Rica. Her research team was capturing turtles off the Pacific coast when they found a turtle with something encrusted in its nose that turned out to be a plastic drinking straw. Visiting researcher Dr. Nathan Robinson, who studied ectobionts on sea turtles at that time, successfully removed the plastic straw and Figgener uploaded the video to YouTube. The video was watched and shared millions of times on different platforms and has been officially named as a catalyst for the global anti-straw movement and a turning point for the anti-plastic movement.

In 2016, she filmed another viral video of a sea turtle entangled in fishing gear that also gained millions of views on YouTube, raising awareness about the danger of the discarded fishing gear, aka ghost nets.

Activism and science communication 
Over the past years, Figgener has collaborated with several organizations to raise awareness of the dangers of marine plastic pollution, including the Plastic Pollution Coalition (The Last Plastic Straw), the Lonely Whale Foundation (Strawless Ocean), Sin Pajilla Porfavor, and Turtles against Plastic.

She has been an invited speaker for events held globally, including the annual Ocean Heroes Bootcamp organized by Captain Planet Foundation, the Lonely Whale Foundation, and Point Break Foundation. Figgener's work and advocacy efforts have already been featured in several documentary films, TV series, radio interviews, and podcast appearances, such as in the 2017 documentary film Straws, the 2019 BBC documentary Nature's Turtle Nursery: Secrets from the Nest, a 2015 National Geographic article "How Did A Sea Turtle Get a Straw Up Its Nose?", the Science Vs podcast episode "Plastics: The Final Straw?", and the 2020 PBS Frontline documentary "Plastic Wars". Figgener dedicates part of her time to mentoring other young scientists and ocean advocates through programs such as Girl Scouts, Skype a Scientist, and Letters to a Pre-Scientist.

In 2018, Figgener was named a Next Generation Leader by Time magazine and a Texan of the Year finalist by The Dallas Morning News. In 2019, she was also awarded the Inspire to Influence Award by Texas Sea Grant and the Ocean Hero Award by Footprint.

Publications 
Figgener is the author of several scientific publications, conference papers, and reports.

Her first popular science book about sea turtles "Meine Reise mit den Meereschildkröten" will be published in March 2023 by Malik, part of the German publishing house Piper, and in 2024 by Greystone Books for the English-speaking audience.

References

External links 
 

1983 births
Living people
German marine biologists